Seokgatap (Sakyamuni Pagoda) is a stone pagoda in South Korea designated as the 21st National Treasure on December 12, 1962.  Its full name is Sakyamuni Yeoraesangjuseolbeop Tap, and is sometimes referred to as the Shadowless Pagoda or the Bulguksa Samcheung Seoktap ("three-storied stone pagoda of Bulguksa").

The pagoda stands 10.75 meters high, directly across from Dabotap within the Bulguksa Temple complex in Gyeongju, South Korea.  It probably dates to around 751, when Bulguksa was completed.

Description
The Seokgatap pagoda is in distinct contrast with its more elaborate brother the Dabotap.  The pagoda is of a very simple and basic design and the three stories have a pleasing 4:3:2 ratio which gives the pagoda a sense of balance, stability, and symmetry.  The contrast between the simplicity of the Seokgatap and the complexity of the Dabotap is designed to represent the dual nature of the Buddha's contemplation and detachment from the world or perhaps it symbolizes the celestial versus the terrestrial.  The pagoda's three stories rest on a two tiered base.  The simplicity of the pagoda is reinforced by the fact that there are no carvings or reliefs on the faces of the pagoda.  Although, the pagoda is surrounded by eight lotus flower stones.  The top of the pagoda, which is rather elaborate, was added in 1973 to match a pagoda that was built one hundred years after Seokgatap.

Construction
Asadal was an outstanding stonemason of Baekje who was brought to Silla to build Dabotap and Seokgatap. After several years with no news of her husband, Asadal's young wife went to Seorabeol to find him. However, she was prevented from entering Bulguksa Temple due to the rule that women were not allowed inside until the pagodas were finished. Feeling sorry for the woman wandering the temple surroundings, one monk told Asadal's wife that she would be able to see the pagoda's shadow in the pond once it was completed. However, there was no shadow visible on the pond's surface. Upon hearing rumors that Asadal intended to marry a Silla princess, his wife threw herself into the pond and drowned. By the time Asadal reached the pond after completing the pagoda, his wife was already dead. In tears, Asadal engraved an image of his wife onto a rock before returning home to Baekje. Afterward, Seokgatap was named the "Shadowless Pagoda" because its shadow was not visible on the pond, while the pond in which Asadal's wife drowned herself was named "Shadow Pond."

Discovery of treasures
In 1966, the monks of the temple were awakened by sounds of exploding dynamite.  They discovered that thieves had attempted to blast the pagoda and steal what was hidden inside.  The thieves ran away before they could steal any of the treasures but the Buddhist monks discovered precious reliquaries, sariras, and the oldest extant example of printed material from a wood block in the world (The Great Dharani Sutra).

National treasure No.126
A sarira is a reliquary that contains the remains of an esteemed monk or sometimes royalty.  After the failed theft by robbers, workers refurbishing and repairing the pagoda found the treasures hidden inside.  Notably, the Dabotap pagoda was dismantled by the Japanese for repairs during the 1920s but no record mentions any treasure recovered.  Treasures included a bronze image of a Buddhist spirit, a bronze mirror, a miniature wooden pagoda, silk, perfume, gogok, and beads.  A bundle of papers were found in the foundation of the pagoda but they are illegible.  

The sarira box is shaped like a house, and has an engraved roof.  Each of the walls of the case have an engraved vine pattern that runs up to the roof.  Lotus motifs are used throughout as well and the top of the roof has a leaf-shaped ornamentation.  

The oldest extant woodblock print is a copy of the Mugujeonggwang, the Great Dharani Sutra.  The text is the oldest extant printed material in the world for several reasons. The pagoda itself was built in 751, the print had to have been made before that date and no other printed material dates before 750–751 CE.  It is 620 centimeters in length and eight centimeters in width.  The print contains, on average, eight to nine characters per line.  The print has deteriorated due to oxidation and restorations in 1988 and 1989 were carried out to preserve the print.

See also
National treasures of Korea
Bulguksa Temple

References

Cultural Heritage Online: National Treasure No.126

Korean pagodas
Stone pagodas
Korean culture
National Treasures of South Korea
Pagodas in South Korea
Buildings and structures in Gyeongju
Tourist attractions in Gyeongju
Silla